Bargen may refer to:

In Germany
Helmstadt-Bargen, in the Rhein-Neckar district, Baden-Württemberg
Rehm-Flehde-Bargen, in the Dithmarschen district, Schleswig-Holstein
Bargen, Hegau, in the Konstanz district, Baden-Württemberg
Bargen, Schleswig, in Erfde, in the Schleswig-Flensburg district, Schleswig-Holstein

in Switzerland
Bargen, Berne, in the canton of Bern
Bargen, Schaffhausen, in the canton of Schaffhausen

in the Netherlands
Bargen, Netherlands, on the island of Texel